The Bendigo East Baseball Club is a Baseball club based in Quarry Hill a suburb of Bendigo. The club was formed in 1961 and plays in the Bendigo Baseball Association winter league. The club fields teams in junior and senior grades, It has won 17 A grade premierships.

History
The Bendigo East Baseball Club or better known as 'East' were formed before the 1961 winter season.

Premierships

Gallery

See also
List of baseball teams in Australia

External links 
Official Website
East clips Falcons' wings. The Advertiser

Australian baseball clubs